Pothyne subvittipennis is a species of beetle in the family Cerambycidae. It was described by Breuning and Ohbayashi, in 1966.

References

subvittipennis
Beetles described in 1966